Sir Ralph Champneys Williams  (9 March 1848 – 22 June 1927) was a British colonial governor.

Life and career
Williams was educated at The King's School, Chester, and at Rossall School. He joined the colonial service in 1884 and his first post was to Bechuanaland. He then served at Pretoria, South Africa, Gibraltar and Barbados, for which he was appointed a Companion of the Order of St Michael and St George (CMG) in the 1901 New Year Honours List. In early 1901 he returned to Bechuanaland as Resident Commissioner at the height of the Second Boer War. Williams was governor of the Windward Islands prior to his appointment as governor of Newfoundland in 1909.

While governor of Newfoundland Williams travelled throughout the island and the coast of Labrador. He was opposed to confederation with Canada and desired to maintain Newfoundland's individuality and hold fast Britain's last tie to North America. In 1913 he published his memoirs, How I Became a Governor.

Legacy
Two Newfoundland towns were renamed for him: Salmon Cove, Trinity Bay, became Champneys, and Greenspond, White Bay, became Williamsport.

See also 
 Governors of Newfoundland
 List of commissioners of Bechuanaland
 Colonial Heads of the Windward Islands
 List of communities in Newfoundland and Labrador
 List of people of Newfoundland and Labrador

References

External links
Biography at Government House The Governorship of Newfoundland and Labrador
Neil Parsons, "The Williams Regime in the Bechuanaland Protectorate 1901–1906" at University of Botswana History Department site.

1848 births
1927 deaths
People from Holyhead
Companions of the Order of St Michael and St George
Commissioners of the Bechuanaland Protectorate
Governors of the Dominion of Newfoundland
People educated at Rossall School
People educated at The King's School, Chester
Colonial Secretaries of Barbados